Rugby union in Tajikistan is a minor but growing sport.

Governing body 
In 2012, Hotam Fayzulloh and others founded the Tajik Rugby Union.

History

Soviet Period
Rugby union was played in the Russian Empire as early as in 1908. In 1934 the Moscow Championship was started, and in 1936 the first Soviet Championship took place.

In 1949, rugby union was forbidden in the USSR during the "fight against the cosmopolitanism". The competitions were resumed in 1957, and the Soviet Championship in 1966. In 1975 the Soviet national team played their first match.

In 1962, rugby in Tajikistan underwent a major expansion as four new teams were founded.

Tajikistan had its own rugby team in the USSR, but it was not treated as a proper national side.

Today
With the founding of the Tajik Rugby Union in 2012, the prerequisites for the creation of Rugby teams (both male and female) in Tajikistan were set.
With the help of NZ filmmaker Faramarz Beheshsti and others, first youth and a female team started training in and around Dushanbe.

See also
 Tajikistan national rugby union team

References 
 Louis, Victor & Jennifer Sport in the Soviet Union (Oxford Pergamon, 1980)

External links
 Article in Tajik language from BBC Website
 Article from German rugby website Totalrugby.de on the founding of Tajik Rugby Union
 Asian Rugby Football Union
 "Islam and Rugby" on the Rugby Readers review

 
Sport in Tajikistan